Ricardo Wayne Morris (born 2 November 1992) is a Jamaican international footballer who plays for Portmore United, as a midfielder.

Club career
Morris has played club football for Portmore United, Tampa Bay Rowdies and Montego Bay United.

In March 2010, Morris had heart surgery.

In 2019, Morris went on loan to VPS in Finland.

International career
He made his international debut for Jamaica in 2014.

International goals
Scores and results list Jamaica's goal tally first.

Honors

Winner RSPL (2): 2017–18, 2018–19

References

1992 births
Living people
Jamaican footballers
Association football midfielders
Portmore United F.C. players
Tampa Bay Rowdies players
Montego Bay United F.C. players
Vaasan Palloseura players
National Premier League players
North American Soccer League players
Veikkausliiga players
Jamaica international footballers
2017 CONCACAF Gold Cup players
2019 CONCACAF Gold Cup players
Jamaican expatriate footballers
Jamaican expatriate sportspeople in the United States
Jamaican expatriate sportspeople in Finland
Expatriate soccer players in the United States
Expatriate footballers in Finland